Gulf Isou Rugby League Club is a semi-professional rugby league club from the Gulf Province of Papua New Guinea. They made their debut in the 2018 season of the Papua New Guinea National Rugby League competition. Their sponsors include Petroleum Resources Kutubu and Mayur Resources.

2022 squad

References

Rugby league in Papua New Guinea
Papua New Guinean rugby league teams